Anna Omarova (born 3 October 1981 in Pyatigorsk) is a Russian shot putter. She represented her country at the Olympic Games in 2008 and at the World Championships in Athletics in 2007 and 2011. In 2007 she won gold medals at the Military World Games and the European Cup.

Personal bests 
Her best throw is 19.69 metres, achieved in June 2007 in Munich.

Doping scandal 
She was banned for doping for two years in March 2017 after re-analysis of a test from 2011, which resulted in disqualification of her performance at the 2011 World Championships in Athletics.

International competitions

National titles
Russian Athletics Championships
Shot put: 2007

See also
List of doping cases in athletics

References

1981 births
Living people
Russian female shot putters
Olympic female shot putters
Olympic athletes of Russia
Athletes (track and field) at the 2008 Summer Olympics
World Athletics Championships athletes for Russia
Russian Athletics Championships winners
Doping cases in athletics
Russian sportspeople in doping cases
People from Pyatigorsk
Sportspeople from Stavropol Krai